Wood National Cemetery is a United States National Cemetery located in Milwaukee, Wisconsin. It is one of two National Cemeteries in Wisconsin. It encompasses , and as of 2021, it had over 40,000 interments. It is closed to new interments.

History 
A part of the Clement J. Zablocki Veterans Association Medical Center, the cemetery was established in 1871 as Soldier Home Cemetery to inter the remains of soldiers who died while under care in the medical center.  In 1937, it was renamed Wood Cemetery in honor of General George Wood, a long-time member of the Board of Managers for the center.  It became a National Cemetery in 1973 and is currently operated by the United States Department of Veterans Affairs. It was the only National Cemetery in Wisconsin until 2015, when Northwoods National Cemetery was established near Rhinelander.

Notable monuments 
 Civil War Soldiers and Sailors monument, a 60' high granite monument erected in 1903.

Notable interments 
 Steward's Mate  Herbert Lewis Hardwick- boxer 
 Ordinary Seaman James K. L. Duncan, Medal of Honor recipient for service aboard USS Fort Hindman during the Civil War.
 Private Milton Matthews, Medal of Honor recipient for action in the Third Battle of Petersburg during the Civil War.
 Boatswain's Mate Michael McCormick, Medal of Honor recipient for service aboard  in the Red River Campaign during the Civil War.
 Corporal Winthrop D. Putnam, Medal of Honor recipient for action in the Battle of Vicksburg during the Civil War.
 Private Lewis A. Rounds, Medal of Honor recipient for action in the Battle of Spotsylvania Court House during the Civil War.

References

External links 
 VA.gov cemetery homepage
 Wood National Cemetery, Milwaukee, Milwaukee, WI at the Historic American Landscapes Survey (HALS)
 
 

United States national cemeteries
Cemeteries in Wisconsin
Buildings and structures in Milwaukee
Geography of Milwaukee
Tourist attractions in Milwaukee
Protected areas of Milwaukee County, Wisconsin
Historic American Landscapes Survey in Wisconsin
1871 establishments in Wisconsin